Noble Township is one of thirteen townships in Noble County, Indiana. As of the 2010 census, its population was 3,094 and it contained 1,642 housing units.

History
The former Luckey Hospital was listed on the National Register of Historic Places in 2013.

Geography

Unincorporated towns
 Bear Lake at 
 Burr Oak at 
 Merriam at 
 Wolf Lake at 
(This list is based on USGS data and may include former settlements.)

References

External links
 Indiana Township Association
 United Township Association of Indiana

Townships in Noble County, Indiana
Townships in Indiana